David Harold Ward Hartnell  (born 29 June 1944) is a New Zealand journalist and media personality best known for his Hollywood gossip column and best-dressed lists.  He was the first full-time celebrity gossip columnist in New Zealand and his work appeared in print, radio and television. His syndicated columns have run in magazines and newspapers around the world.  Hartnell is the author of ten books, the Patron of the Variety Artists Club of New Zealand Inc and the Ambassador of St James Saviours.  In April 2014 he was named Ambassador of the Prostate Cancer Foundation of New Zealand and in September 2016 the Patron of the Brotherhood of Auckland Magicians Inc.

In May 2021 he received a star on the New Zealand Walk of Fame in Orewa.

Biography
Hartnell was born in the Auckland suburb of Sandringham in 1944 as David Segetin. As a child he became interested in magic and roller-skating. He was raised by his mother and grandparents after his father left when he was young.  He later discovered a half-brother and sister who knew nothing of his existence. In 1959 he was a runner-up in the dance pairs at the World Roller Skating Championships in Christchurch.

After moving to Sydney he found a position with Revlon and became Australia's first in-store male make-up artist. He made-up comedian Phyllis Diller as a publicity stunt and the pair became lifelong friends.  After a sojourn in Hong Kong, Hartnell moved to London and worked as a makeup artist for instore promotions, magazine shoots and the 1970 Miss World pageant.  He moved to New York for a position with Maybelline and then relocated to Los Angeles.  It was at this time that Hartnell began to interview the celebrities he met.

Returning to New Zealand in 1975, Hartnell became involved with TVNZ television shows Town Cryer and Two on One and became a celebrity himself.  He became involved with radio with weekly slots on Radio Pacific and Radio i and later appeared with radio personality Alice Worsley on New Zealand's first-ever television shopping show.  His Hollywood gossip columns appeared in NZ Woman's Weekly, Woman's Day and the Sunday News and his catchphrases "I'm not one to gossip but..." and "my lips are sealed" became part of New Zealand popular culture. In 1981, Hartnell began his popular New Zealand's best- and worst-dressed lists, a yearly celebration of Kiwi celebrities that has become a tradition.

He was the chairman of the judges for the Miss New Zealand contest between 1982 and 1987.

In 1995 he fronted The David Hartnell Show, a chat show on New Zealand's Triangle Television.

In 2009 Hartnell became a patron of the Variety Artists Club of New Zealand Inc.

In the 2011 Queen's Birthday Honours, he was appointed a Member of the New Zealand Order of Merit, for services to entertainment. His book Memoirs of a Gossip Columnist was published in 2011.

In September 2012 Hartnell was named an Ambassador of St James Saviours, the trust formed to save the iconic Auckland theatre.  In April 2014 he was named Ambassador of the Prostate Cancer Foundation of New Zealand.

In September 2016 he was made patron of the Brotherhood of Auckland Magicians Inc.

He has lived with his partner Somboon Khansuk since 1993.

In October 2017 he was presented with the President's Medallion from the Variety Artists Club of New Zealand in recognition of his services as Patron.

In 2020 he became a regular guest on Three's The AM Show with the Hartnell's Hollywood segment.

Awards and honours

 2021 Star on New Zealand Walk of Fame, Orewa
 2021 Presidential Citation, Brotherhood of Auckland Magicians Inc
 2017 President's Medallion, Variety Artists Club of New Zealand Inc
 2016 Patron Brotherhood of Auckland Magicians
 2014 Ambassador of the Prostate Cancer Foundation of New Zealand
 2013 Fullers Entertainment Award, Variety Artists Club of New Zealand Inc
 2012 Ambassador of St James Saviours
 2011 Honorary member of the official Emmerdale Fan Club UK
 2011 Member of the New Zealand Order of Merit
 2011 Star on Walk of Fame at Boulevard of Dreams
 2009 Patron Variety Artists Club of New Zealand Inc
 2000 Auckland Planet Hollywood Hall of Fame
 1998 Scroll of Honour, Variety Artists Club of New Zealand Inc
 1985 Greymouth Walk of Fame and Key to the City

Publications
 2014 David Hartnell's Celebrity Quiz Book
 2011 Memoirs of a Gossip Columnist
 2003 David Hartnell's Hollywood Trivia
 1997 David Hartnell's Celebrity Fact-File
 1990 I'm Not One to Gossip, But …
 1984 David Hartnell's Guide to Beauty
 1979 Beauty from 30 to 90
 1978 David Hartnell's Book of Beauty
 1975 David Hartnell on Makeup for New Zealand Women
 1968 David Hartnell's Makeup and Skin Care Cards

Television career and appearances

 Seven Sharp, 2021, Star on the New Zealand Walk of Fame
 Seven Sharp, 2021, Royal Family Oprah interview fallout
 The AM Show, 2020, career profile and regular Hartnell's Hollywood segment
 Seven Sharp, 2020, career profile
 Te Ao with Moana, 2020, story on Prince Tui Teka
 Native Affairs, 2017, feature on Merle Oberon
 Te Radar's Chequered Past, 2017, feature on Anna Hoffman
 Paul Henry, 2015, Annual Best-Dressed List
 Seven Sharp, 2015, Feature story on the Orewa Walk of Fame
 Paul Henry, 2015, Celebrity panel
 Good Morning, 2014, Celebrity Quiz Book
 The Paul Henry Show, 2014, Recent Best-Dressed List and Celebrity Quiz Book
 The Beat Goes On, 2014, Profiled as the only gossip columnist that has been awarded by the Queen
 The Beat Goes On, 2011, Star on the Orewa Walk of Fame
 3 News, 2011
 Close Up, 2011
 Happy Birthday TVNZ, 2010
 The David Hartnell Show, series on Triangle TV, 2004
 Maggie’s Garden Show, guest appearance, 1999
 60 Minutes, 1997
 The Express Report, 1996
 Good Morning, Celebrity Gossip regular for three years plus guest appearances
 The EarlyBird Show
 The Billy T. James Show
 Saunders and Sinclair, 1985 – Makeup Artist and Celebrity Gossip
 Tonight, 1985
 Kaye and Guest, 1979
 Two on One, 1975 – Makeup Artist and Celebrity Gossip
 Town Cryer

References

External links
 David Hartnell Official Site
 New Zealand's Greatest Gossip Has Some Words For Modern Celebrities, The Spinoff, June 2021
 David Hartnell added to New Zealand Walk of Fame in Orewa, One News 2021
 David Hartnell says Meghan and Harry should have 'named, names' when accusing royal family of racism, March 2021 TVNZ
 The best dressed Kiwis list is out, Stuff.co.nz, November 2020
 David Hartnell on a Life Watching Hollywood, Stuff.co.nz, July 2020
 A Quiet Cuppa With David Hartnell, A Quiet Cuppa, June 2020
 David Hartnell's Favourite Summer Object, Stuff.co.nz, January 2019
 Godfather of gossip David Hartnell honoured for 53 years in the spotlight, Stuff.co.nz October 2017
 David Hartnell's First Love, New Zealand Woman's Weekly September 2016 
 Twelve Questions with David Hartnell, New Zealand Herald August 2015
 David Hartnell Keeps Faith With JAFAs, Sunday Star Times July 2015 
 Stars In His Eyes, Glory Days Magazine January 2015 
 David's Triple Celebration – 70th Birthday, 50 years in Gossip and 21 years with partner Somboon, New Zealand Woman's Weekly June 2014
 Audio : David Hartnell interviewed by Leighton Smith on NewstalkZB about his Celebrity Quiz Book, July 2014 
 David Hartnell – My Starring Role, New Zealand Woman's Weekly interview January 2014
 Breakfast Coffee with Prime Minister John Key, GrownUps Column, December 2014 
 David Hartnell's Blooming Surprise, NZ Woman's Weekly September 2014 
 Ten Questions with David Hartnell, Recipient of the Fullers Entertainment Award, August 2013
 Bid to Save Iconic St James Theatre, Fairfax News June 2013
 From Roller Rinks to Hollywood, Forward 50+ Lifestyle Magazine March/April 2013 
 Ghost Power, Lucky Break Magazine September 2012 
 Twelve Questions with David Hartnell, New Zealand Herald August 2012
 Michele Hewitson interview: David Hartnell, New Zealand Herald March 2012
 Audio interview with David Hartnell on bFM, 2011 
 Audio interview with David Hartnell on The Breeze, 2011
 Memoirs of a Gossip Columnist Review, Southland Times
 Audio : David Hartnell interviewed by Grant Walker, Radio New Zealand June 2018
 
 
 
 
 
 Video : Seven Sharp, story on the Orewa Walk of Fame, 2015
 
 
 
 
 
 
 
 
 
 
 
 
 
 
 
 
 
 

1944 births
Living people
People from Auckland
Gossip columnists
Members of the New Zealand Order of Merit
New Zealand television journalists
New Zealand gay writers
21st-century LGBT people